This page lists the winners and nominees for the Soul Train Music Award for Best Gospel/Inspirational Song. The award was originally entitled Best Gospel Performance – Male, Female or Group and was created during the 2009 ceremony. It was later retitled to Best Gospel/Inspirational Performance in 2013 and then to its current title in 2014. Mary Mary and Lecrae are the only artists to win this award twice.

Winners and nominees
Winners are listed first and highlighted in bold.

2000s

2010s

2020s

References

Soul Train Music Awards
Song awards